Waves under Water is a Swedish darkwave/synthpop band formed in October 2007 by the singer Angelica Segerbäck and the composer Johan Svärdshammar. The band has a romantic image which flirts with goth, steampunk and new romantic.

Biography
The band recorded their first two songs "Winter Garden" and "My Cup" in 2007 on the first day, under the temporary name Hopscotch. Soon they changed their name to Waves under Water and in May 2008 they released their first demo titled Winter Garden. Their debut album Serpents and the Tree was released in October 2009 on their own label Calorique Records together with Danse Macabre. The album entered at number 8 in the Deutsche Alternative Charts. The main theme of the album is Norse pagan myths and the drama between winter and summer, and the album title refers to the tree Yggdrasil.

Apart from the founders Angelica Segerbäck and Johan Svärdshammar, there is also one live member,  Ursula Ewrelius on synth. On stage, the band uses different kinds of instruments like synths, guitars, cello, glockenspiel and a bass played with a sickle.

Segerbäck and Svärdshammar also have the side project LinaLaukaR.

Band members
Angelica Segerbäck, (Vocals, Lyrics, Music, Glockenspiel, Cello)
Johan Svärdshammar, (Music, Lyrics, Backing Vocals, Synth, Bass played with sickle, Guitar)

Live Band Members
Ursula Ewrelius, (Synth, Bass guitar) Live member from 2009

Discography

Albums
Winter Garden – (Demo) 2008
A Short Presentation of – (Demo) 2009
Serpents and the Tree – (CD Album) 2009 - Calorique Records, Danse Macabre
All of Your Light - (CD Album) 2011 - Danse Macabre

Singles
Winter Garden – (digital) 2009
Red Red Star – (digital) 2010
Tomorrow - (digital) 2011

Compilation appearances
Dark Alliance vol. 3 – (CD) 2009, Track #1 "Serpents and the Tree" - Danse Macabre
New Signs & Sounds 11/09 – (CD) 2009, Track #2 "Serpents and the Tree" - Zillo
Sonic Seducer Cold Hands Seduction Vol. 100 (CD) 2009, Track #7 "Winter Garden" - Sonic Seducer
Gothic Lifestyle 3 (CD) Nov 2009, Track #13 "Serpents and the Tree" - Gothic Magazine
EXTREME traumfänger 10 (CD) Dec 2009, Track #9 "Nothing More" - UpScene
Die Zillo-CD 05/2010 (CD) Apr 2010, Track #15 "Red Red Star" - Zillo
Dark Alliance vol. 7 – (CD) 2010, Track #8 "Red Red Star" - Danse Macabre
VA-Zillo New Signs & Sounds 02 - 2011 (CD) Feb 2011, Track #5 "Tomorrow" - Zillo
Gothic Compilation 50 (2CD) Feb 2011, CD2 Track #15 - Gothic

References

External links
 Official Myspace
 Danse Macabre's Waves under Water page
 

Swedish musical groups
Musical groups established in 2007
Swedish dark wave musical groups